Burdekin is a surname. Notable people with the surname include:

Beaufort Burdekin (1891–1963), British rower
Katharine Burdekin (1896–1963), British novelist
Marshall Burdekin (1837–1886), Australian politician
Michael Burdekin, British civil engineer
Sydney Burdekin (1839–1899), Australian politician